Oday Ibrahim Mohammad Dabbagh (born 3 December 1998) is a Palestinian footballer who plays as a forward for Primeira Liga club Arouca and the Palestine football team.

Club career

Hilal Al-Quds 
Dabbagh made his professional debut as a 16 year old for Hilal Al-Quds during the 2015–16 season. His first professional goal came on 26 December 2015 – 23 days after his 17th birthday. He scored two more goals that season, helping Hilal Al-Quds avoid relegation.

He increased his scoring output in the following seasons, scoring 9, 12, and 16 goals respectively, as Hilal Al-Quds won an unprecedented three straight West Bank Premier League titles. He won the WBPL's golden boot in 2018–19 after scoring 16 goals.

On 6 May 2019, Dabbagh became Palestine's all-time leading scorer at the AFC Cup after scoring a brace against Nejmeh of Lebanon.

Al-Arabi
Dabbagh joined Al-Arabi on 14 January 2021, until the end of the season. Dabbagh helped Al-Arabi win the 2020–21 Kuwaiti Premier League title, and finished the season as league top-scorer with 13 goals.

Arouca
On 21 August 2021, Dabbagh joined Arouca in the Portuguese Primeira Liga, on a two-year contract. He made his debut on 28 August, as an 80th-minute substitute in a 3–0 defeat to Porto. On 18 September, Dabbagh scored his first goal in a 2–2 draw to Vitória.

In a 2–0 win over Estoril on 7 January 2023, he scored his first brace for the club. Dabbagh continued his excellent form after two games, assisting Arouca to a 4–0 victory over Portimonense, in which he also scored two goals.

On 1 July 2023, he will move to Charleroi in the Belgian Pro League.

International career
Dabbagh made his national team debut on 27 March 2018, in a 2019 AFC Asian Cup qualifier game against Oman. He later appeared with the senior national team in the 2018 Bangabandhu Cup, which Palestine won. Dabbagh's first senior goal came on 6 September 2018, in a 1–1 draw with Kyrgyzstan.

At just 20 years of age, Dabbagh was called up for the 2019 AFC Asian Cup, and appeared against Australia and Jordan.

Personal life
Dabbagh was born in the Old City of Jerusalem.

Career statistics

Club

International

Scores and results list Palestine's goal tally first, score column indicates score after each Dabbagh goal.

Honours
Hilal Al-Quds
 West Bank Premier League: 2016–17, 2017–18, 2018–19
 Palestine Cup: 2017–18
 West Bank Cup: 2017–18

Qadsia
 Kuwait Super Cup: 2019

Al-Arabi
 Kuwaiti Premier League: 2020–21

Palestine
 Bangabandhu Cup: 2018

Individual
 Islamic Solidarity Games top goalscorer: 2017
 Kuwaiti Premier League top goalscorer: 2020–21

References

External links
 
 
 

1998 births
Living people
Footballers from Jerusalem
Palestinian footballers
Association football forwards
Hilal Al-Quds Club players
Al Salmiya SC players
Qadsia SC players
Al-Yarmouk SC (Kuwait) players
Al-Arabi SC (Kuwait) players
F.C. Arouca players
West Bank Premier League players
Kuwait Premier League players

Palestine youth international footballers
Footballers at the 2018 Asian Games
Palestine international footballers
2019 AFC Asian Cup players
Palestinian expatriate footballers
Palestinian expatriate sportspeople in Kuwait
Palestinian expatriate sportspeople in Portugal
Expatriate footballers in Kuwait
Expatriate footballers in Portugal